Gana Hill is a hill in the Lowther Hills range, part of the Southern Uplands of Scotland. Often considered the hill on which the source of the River Clyde begins, it is normally climbed with the neighbouring hills.

References

Mountains and hills of the Southern Uplands
Mountains and hills of Dumfries and Galloway
Donald mountains